Princess Supreme Jeguk (22 July 1251 – 11 June 1297), also known as Queen Jangmok and Queen Mother Inmyeong was a Yuan imperial princess as the youngest daughter of Kublai Khan born by his primary wife Chabi . She became the first Goryeo queen consort from Yuan. She was the primary wife of Chungnyeol of Goryeo and the mother of his successor, Chungseon of Goryeo. Her personal name was Borjigin Qutlugh Kelmysh.

She was the great-granddaughter of Genghis Khan and was known as a princess supreme as the aunt of the Emperor. She was the aunt of Temür Khan, who later succeeded her father as the Yuan emperor. From all of Mongol consorts in Goryeo, just she who was Yuan Emperor's daughter.

Biography

Early life
Borjigin Qutugh Kelmysh (보르지긴 쿠틀룩 켈미쉬 [홀도로게리미실 or 홀독겁미사], 孛儿支斤 忽都魯揭里迷失) was born on 22 July 1251 in Mongol Empire as the youngest daughter  (Imperial Princess) of Kublai Khan and Chabi khatun.

Marriage relation with Goryeo
At 23 years old on 11 May 1274, she married the 39-years-old Crown Prince Wang Geo of Goryeo and after he ascended the throne as the new king, she became his Queen Consort passed his firstly-married wife who was the granddaughter of Duke Yangyang due to when Goryeo became a vassal state of the Mongol Empire, Goryeo's influence was restrained and made Jeongsin must step back from her position to a royal consort.

After came to Goryeo, Qutugh Kelmysh brought her own servants and they continued to practice Mongol customs, Chungnyeol even scolded the priests for not changing their hair in the Yuan style. This made Mongolian customs became prevalent in Goryeo since their country's mother was Mongols's princess. As one of Mongolian custom, Qutugh built a Mongolian-style tent called Gung-ryeo (궁려, 穹廬) and held an amulet rite of her ancestors using white sheep's oil.

Palace life
On 6 January 1275, Qutugh was honoured as Princess Wonseong (원성공주, 元成公主) while lived in Wonseong Hall, Gyeongseong Palace (경성궁 원성전, 敬成宮 元成殿). Under Chungnyeol's order, a wealth was established for her, named "Eungseon" (응선, 膺善) and royal family was placed there. It was said that the Princess loved to enjoy banquets, even after her mother died. Also, if someone was close with her, they would be released quickly even if committed a serious crime. Jo In-gyu (조인규), who embezzled the State's wealth and acquitted innocent people, quickly released from Guiyang since he close to the princess and later rose to the position of Inspector General (감찰대부).

Want if her peoples live more better, she showed aspects such as urging Chungnyeol, who frequently hunts, to stop hunting and put effort into the affairs of the country and also said to have a very strict and strong, but bright. She didn't forgive anyone among her close associates who made a mistake. In the following year, exactly on 20 October 1275, she gave birth into their first son, Wang Jang (then known as King Chungseon) in Sapan Palace (사판궁, 沙坂宮).

In December, a banquet was held to celebrate the newborn Prince's birth. However, when Chungnyeol ordered that she and his first wife be placed in the same position, she thought that she and his first wife were treated as equals and became very angry with suddenly moved Jeongsin's seat. After a while, Jeongsin knelt down and offered a glass of wine to her, but the King turned around and blinked. Finally, the banquet ended right away.

In May 1276, she and Chungnyeol visited Heungwang Temple (흥왕사) and while she took the gold pagoda from that Temple into the palace, the decorations for the pagoda were stolen by the servants Holadae (홀라대, 忽刺歹) and Samga (삼가, 三哥), who followed her to Goryeo. Qutugh originally intended to dismantle it and use it privately, but when Chungnyeol prevented it, she cried. When they got back to there, Heungwang Temple's members begged her to the return the gold pagoda of the gold tower, but she refused.

In December 1276, someone put an anonymous letter into the residence of Seokmalcheongu (석말천구, 石抹天衢; Darughachi). The person who put in the anonymous letter immediately exclaimed:
"If you have clothes, wear them, and if you have rice, eat them, don't make it someone else's income.""옷이 있거든 입고 밥이 있거든 먹어 다른 이의 소득이 되게 하지 말라."
The day after it was put in, Seokmalcheongu reported this to Chungnyeol and her. The letter also said that
"Princess Jeonghwa has lost the King's favor, so she has a female shaman to curse the Princess. Also, 43 people, including Duke Jean, plan to do something unpleasant and try to enter Ganghwa-do again.""정화궁주가 왕의 총애를 잃자 여자 무당을 시켜 공주를 저주하게 하고 있다. 또 제안공을 비롯한 43명이 불궤한 짓을 도모하여 다시 강화도로 들어가려고 한다.")
Infuriated by this, she imprisoned Jeongsin in Najang (나장, 螺匠) and sealed off her obituary. After hearing the earnest appeal of Yu-Gyeong (유경  柳璥), Qutugh was moved and realized something, so she released them all.

In 1277, she gave birth into their daughter, but died not long after that. Then, in July, they went to Cheonhyo Temple (천효사, 天孝寺), but she returned to the palace and saying that there were few attendants, so the King. After his back, she beat him with a staff and her anger was relieved a little, then went back to the Temple. One year later, she gave birth again into their second son, but died early too.

Later, when King Wonjong of Goryeo's 2nd wife, Princess Gyeongchang doing a curse with had her son, Wang Jong married Qutugh Kelmysh and tried to ascend the throne. Upon received this report, Chungnyeol ordered his ministers to studied Gyeongchang and protected Wang Jong. However, in this case, the ministers insisted that the destruction of property should also be directed by the Yuan dynasty, which was the merchant country, so they decided to follow the confiscated policy. Since she strongly insisted on skipping this procedure and confiscating the property, their property was eventually confiscated under her command. Afterwards, under Yuan dynasty's direction, on 16 September 1277, Gyeongchang was deposed from her position and reduced to commoner status and Wang Jong was exiled to Gueum-do (구음도, 仇音島).

On 20 March 1281, Chungnyeol was given Yuan Imperial title Prince Consort [King] of State (부마국왕, 駙馬國王) since he was one of their Princess's husband. In the next year, as the father-in-law, Kublai Khan gave the best medical officer from Song Dynasty to Chungnyeol, named Yeon Deok-sin (연덕신, 鍊德新) and his medicine was said to made strengthens Chungnyeol's stamina. However, Goryeo astronomer O Yun-bu (오윤부) said, "This medicine is not good for the king's body and this make prevent the descendants from prospering." After the King took the medicine, the Princess never became pregnant again.

While Chungnyeol enshrined a new deity in ancestor ritual and held a ritual for it, she wasn't allow to participate by claiming that "Ancestor ritual (태묘) is a place where the spirits of ancestors reside" that the princess would participate in the ancestral rites together. Also, hearing that a strange phenomenon appeared in the sky when the princess started the construction of a new palace, O Yun-bu advised he to stop the construction of the palace and cultivate virtue. But, she didn't listen this and instead started building the palace again. She then ordered O to choose a choice, but she refused to do so and they were excommunicated.

Then, on 29 June 1294, Qutugh Kelmysh was given the new title as Princess Anpyeong (안평공주, 安平公主) by her nephew, Temür Khan. During her lifetime, she was said for tried to devote herself to the national affairs and helped her husband in government.

Later life and death
In 1297, she went to Hyanggak, Sugang Palace (수강궁) and ordered the servants to pick up a peony in full bloom. Then she looked at this peony for a long time and sobbed. After a while, she fell ill and three days later, she and her husband traveled to Hyeonseong Temple (현성사, 賢聖寺), where she died, she was 46 years old.

She was buried in Goreung Tomb (고릉, 高陵) and then received her Posthumous names in September. Around 1297, her son, murdered his father's concubine, Lady Si and said that his mother's illness was caused by the speculation of the former King's favor. After exiling, killing or imprisoning several people related to his mother, a beautiful widow (later known as Consort Won), was dedicated to King Chungnyeol and shocked by this, he then abdicated his throne to Chungseon and resigned as King Emeritus. 

After Wang Won ascended the throne in 1298, he honored his mother as Queen Mother Inmyeong (인명태후, 仁明太后) along with visited Myoryeon Temple (묘련사, 妙蓮寺), her original temple. At this time, both of King of Jin (진왕, 晉王) and King Go of Dang (고당왕, 高唐王) sent their peoples to mourn and honor her. In 1310, Temür Khan honoured his aunt as Imperial Aunt, the Princess Supreme of Je State (제국대장공주, 齊國大長公主) and enshrined in Chungnyeol's shrine.

Others
Some scholars evaluated that Princess Jeguk was treated completely differently from the previous Goryeo Queen consorts and that she exercised more powerful authority than the King by putting her status as a Yuan Dynasty Imperial Princess. In addition, there were evaluation that she wasted her national treasury on her immortality because she believed in Buddhism too much.

Based on 고려에 시집온 몽골공주들, 남편 편들어 元관리와 맞섰다

Family
Father: Kublai Khan of Yuan (23 September 1215 – 18 February 1294) (쿠빌라이 칸)
Grandfather: Tolui Khan of Mongol Empire (1192–1232) (툴루이 칸)
Grandmother: Sorghaghtani Beki (1191–1252) (소르칵타니)
Mother: Chabi Khatun of Yuan(28 January 1216 - 20 March 1281) (차비 카툰)
Grandfather: Chigu Noyan of Khongirad
Grandmother: Tümelün Bekhi
Husband: King Chungryeol of Goryeo (3 April 1236 – 30 July 1308) (고려 충렬왕)
Son: King Chungseon of Goryeo (20 October 1275 – 23 June 1325) (고려 충선왕)
Daughter-in-law: Grand Princess Gyeguk of the Borjigin clan (?–1315) (계국대장공주)
Son: Unnamed son (1278–?)
Daughter: Unnamed daughter (1277–?)

In popular culture
Portrayed by Jang Young-nam and Kim Bo-ra in the 2017 MBC TV series The King in Love.

See also 
 Goryeo under Mongol rule

References

External links
인명태후 on Doosan Encyclopedia .
제국대장공주 on Encykorea .
제국대장공주 on EToday News .

13th-century Mongolian women
1297 deaths
1259 births
Mongol consorts of the Goryeo Dynasty
Korean queens consort
Borjigin
13th-century Korean women
Chinese princesses